Grunwald Poznań can refer to:

Grunwald, Poznań, a district of the city of Poznań
Grunwald Poznań (sports club), a multi-sports club
Grunwald Poznań (football)
Grunwald Poznań (field hockey)
Grunwald Poznań (handball)